China Airlines Flight 358 was a Boeing 747-2R7F/SCD freighter that crashed on December 29, 1991, shortly after takeoff from Chiang Kai-shek International Airport near Taipei, Taiwan.

Aircraft 
The aircraft was a Boeing 747-2R7F/SCD, built in September 1980 for Cargolux as the City of Esch-sur-Alzette, registration LX-ECV, MSN 22390. It was acquired by China Airlines in June 1985 was given its registration of B-198. It had been in service for 11 years, 3 months. The aircraft had clocked a total of 45,868 hours of flight time during its time in service. The last A-check maintenance had occurred on 21 December 1991, and the aircraft had accumulated 74 hours of flight time since that point.

Accident 
Several minutes after takeoff, the crew reported problems with the #2 engine, prompting Taipei air traffic control (ATC) to vector the flight into a left turn to return to the airport. Approximately two minutes later, the crew reported that they were unable to turn left, and ATC approved a right-hand turn instead. This was the last radio contact made by the crew. The crew lost control of the aircraft and it struck a hill, right wing first, near Wanli, Taipei. All five crew members died in the crash, and there were no injuries on the ground.

Investigation 
The subsequent investigation revealed that the number 3 engine and its pylon had separated from the aircraft and struck the number 4 engine, breaking it off the wing as well. A more detailed investigation revealed that the pylon midspar fittings, which attach the pylon to the lower portion of the wing front spar, had failed.  The search for the number 3 engine and its pylon, which landed in the sea, took several months.

Information from the investigation of this crash and the nearly identical crash of El Al Flight 1862 ten months later resulted in Boeing ordering pylon modifications to every 747 in use.

The aircraft was the same one involved in the China Airlines Flight 334 hijacking on 3 May 1986.

References

Airliner accidents and incidents caused by in-flight structural failure
Airliner accidents and incidents caused by mechanical failure
Airliner accidents and incidents caused by maintenance errors
Accidents and incidents involving cargo aircraft
Accidents and incidents involving the Boeing 747
Aviation accidents and incidents in 1991
Aviation accidents and incidents in Taiwan
358
December 1991 events in Asia
1991 in Taiwan
Airliner accidents and incidents involving in-flight engine separations
1991 disasters in Taiwan